Plac Grunwaldzki may refer to:

 Plac Grunwaldzki in Szczecin
 Plac Grunwaldzki in Warszawa
 Plac Grunwaldzki in Wrocław
Plac Grunwaldzki (osiedle), a housing estate in Wroclaw